Blankenheim is a municipality in the Mansfeld-Südharz district, Saxony-Anhalt, Germany.

History 

The earliest known documented mention of Blankenheim dates from 1181. The development of the place was closely connected to the history of the Premonstratenian monastery Rode in the modern-day Klosterrode.

References

Municipalities in Saxony-Anhalt
Mansfeld-Südharz